Todd Wilson (born 4 May 1965) is an American former Nordic combined skier who competed in the 1988 Winter Olympics and in the 1992 Winter Olympics.

References

1965 births
Living people
American male Nordic combined skiers
Olympic Nordic combined skiers of the United States
Nordic combined skiers at the 1988 Winter Olympics
Nordic combined skiers at the 1992 Winter Olympics
Skiers from Denver